is a passenger railway station in located in the city of Neyagawa, Osaka Prefecture, Japan, operated by the private railway company Keihan Electric Railway.

Lines
Neyagawashi Station is served by the  Keihan Main Line, and is located 15.0 km from the starting point of the line at Yodoyabashi Station.

Station layout
The station has two opposed elevated side platforms with the station building underneath. The platforms can accommodate trains of up to eight carriages in length.

Platforms

Adjacent stations

History
It was renamed on August 20, 1951.

Passenger statistics
In fiscal 2019, the station was used by an average of 64,411 passengers daily.

Surrounding area
 Neyagawa City Hall
 Neyagawa Civic Center 
 Osaka Prefectural Neyagawa High School
 Neyagawa City Chuo Elementary School

References

External links

Official home page 

Railway stations in Japan opened in 1910
Railway stations in Osaka Prefecture
Neyagawa, Osaka